A bronze bust of Alexander Skene is installed in Brooklyn's Grand Army Plaza, in the U.S. state of New York.

References

External links
 

Bronze sculptures in Brooklyn
Monuments and memorials in Brooklyn
Grand Army Plaza
Outdoor sculptures in Brooklyn
Sculptures of men in New York City